KCVL (1240 AM) is a radio station licensed to Colville, Washington, United States.  The station is owned by North Country Broadcasting.

Programming 
KCVL carries CBS News Radio and Coast to Coast AM.

References

External links
FCC History Cards for KCVL

CVL
Country radio stations in the United States
Radio stations established in 1956
1956 establishments in Washington (state)